The Zuiko Digital 25mm f/2.8 is a Four Thirds System standard-series lens manufactured by Olympus, sold both separately and bundled in a kit with the E-420 camera.

It is a "pancake" lens, a very compact prime lens designed to be easily portable. When released on the market in 2008, it was one of a very few prime lenses designed explicitly for digital cameras, and the only one targeted at the entry-level consumer market.

It was praised by reviewers for its small size and the sharpness of the images it produced, but at the price of relatively high chromatic aberration and barrel distortion; overall, the image quality was seen as no real improvement over the normal Olympus 14-42mm f/3.5-5.6 kit lens.

References

External links
 Official Webpage
 

Pancake lenses
025mm F2.8
Camera lenses introduced in 2008